Domingas Cordeiro (born 1 May 1976) is an Angolan handball player.  

She competed at the 1996 Summer Olympics, where Angola placed 7th. She was also part of the Angolan team at the 2000 Summer Olympics.

References

External links
 

1976 births
Living people

Angolan female handball players
Olympic handball players of Angola
Handball players at the 1996 Summer Olympics
Handball players at the 2000 Summer Olympics